In five-dimensional geometry, a stericated 5-cube is a convex uniform 5-polytope with fourth-order truncations (sterication) of the regular 5-cube.

There are eight degrees of sterication for the 5-cube, including permutations of runcination, cantellation, and truncation. The simple stericated 5-cube is also called an expanded 5-cube, with the first and last nodes ringed, for being constructible by an expansion operation applied to the regular 5-cube. The highest form, the steriruncicantitruncated 5-cube, is more simply called an omnitruncated 5-cube with all of the nodes ringed.

Stericated 5-cube

Alternate names 
 Stericated penteract / Stericated 5-orthoplex / Stericated pentacross
 Expanded penteract / Expanded 5-orthoplex / Expanded pentacross
 Small cellated penteractitriacontaditeron (Acronym: scant) (Jonathan Bowers)

Coordinates 
The Cartesian coordinates of the vertices of a stericated 5-cube having edge length 2 are all permutations of:

Images 
The stericated 5-cube is constructed by a sterication operation applied to the 5-cube.

Steritruncated 5-cube

Alternate names
 Steritruncated penteract
 Celliprismated triacontaditeron (Acronym: capt) (Jonathan Bowers)

Construction and coordinates

The Cartesian coordinates of the vertices of a steritruncated 5-cube having edge length 2 are all permutations of:

Images

Stericantellated 5-cube

Alternate names 
 Stericantellated penteract
 Stericantellated 5-orthoplex, stericantellated pentacross
 Cellirhombated penteractitriacontiditeron (Acronym: carnit) (Jonathan Bowers)

Coordinates 
The Cartesian coordinates of the vertices of a stericantellated 5-cube having edge length 2 are all permutations of:

Images

Stericantitruncated 5-cube

Alternate names 
 Stericantitruncated penteract
 Steriruncicantellated triacontiditeron / Biruncicantitruncated pentacross
 Celligreatorhombated penteract (cogrin) (Jonathan Bowers)

Coordinates 
The Cartesian coordinates of the vertices of an stericantitruncated 5-cube having an edge length of 2 are given by all permutations of coordinates and sign of:

Images

Steriruncitruncated 5-cube

Alternate names 
 Steriruncitruncated penteract / Steriruncitruncated 5-orthoplex / Steriruncitruncated pentacross
 Celliprismatotruncated penteractitriacontiditeron  (captint) (Jonathan Bowers)

Coordinates 
The Cartesian coordinates of the vertices of an steriruncitruncated penteract having an edge length of 2 are given by all permutations of coordinates and sign of:

Images

Steritruncated 5-orthoplex

Alternate names
 Steritruncated pentacross
 Celliprismated penteract (Acronym: cappin) (Jonathan Bowers)

Coordinates 
Cartesian coordinates for the vertices of a steritruncated 5-orthoplex, centered at the origin, are all permutations of

Images

Stericantitruncated 5-orthoplex

Alternate names 
 Stericantitruncated pentacross
 Celligreatorhombated triacontaditeron (cogart) (Jonathan Bowers)

Coordinates 
The Cartesian coordinates of the vertices of an stericantitruncated 5-orthoplex having an edge length of 2 are given by all permutations of coordinates and sign of:

Images

Omnitruncated 5-cube

Alternate names 
 Steriruncicantitruncated 5-cube (Full expansion of omnitruncation for 5-polytopes by Johnson)
 Omnitruncated penteract
 Omnitruncated triacontiditeron / omnitruncated pentacross
 Great cellated penteractitriacontiditeron (Jonathan Bowers)

Coordinates 
The Cartesian coordinates of the vertices of an omnitruncated 5-cube having an edge length of 2 are given by all permutations of coordinates and sign of:

Images

Full snub 5-cube 

The full snub 5-cube or omnisnub 5-cube, defined as an alternation of the omnitruncated 5-cube is not uniform, but it can be given Coxeter diagram  and symmetry [4,3,3,3]+, and constructed from 10 snub tesseracts, 32 snub 5-cells, 40 snub cubic antiprisms, 80 snub tetrahedral antiprisms, 80 3-4 duoantiprisms, and 1920 irregular 5-cells filling the gaps at the deleted vertices.

Related polytopes 
This polytope is one of 31 uniform 5-polytopes generated from the regular 5-cube or 5-orthoplex.

Notes

References 
 H.S.M. Coxeter: 
 H.S.M. Coxeter, Regular Polytopes, 3rd Edition, Dover New York, 1973 
 Kaleidoscopes: Selected Writings of H.S.M. Coxeter, editied by F. Arthur Sherk, Peter McMullen, Anthony C. Thompson, Asia Ivic Weiss, Wiley-Interscience Publication, 1995,  
 (Paper 22) H.S.M. Coxeter, Regular and Semi Regular Polytopes I, [Math. Zeit. 46 (1940) 380-407, MR 2,10]
 (Paper 23) H.S.M. Coxeter, Regular and Semi-Regular Polytopes II, [Math. Zeit. 188 (1985) 559-591]
 (Paper 24) H.S.M. Coxeter, Regular and Semi-Regular Polytopes III, [Math. Zeit. 200 (1988) 3-45]
 Norman Johnson Uniform Polytopes, Manuscript (1991)
 N.W. Johnson: The Theory of Uniform Polytopes and Honeycombs, Ph.D. 
  x3o3o3o4x - scan, x3o3o3x4x - capt, x3o3x3o4x - carnit, x3o3x3x4x - cogrin, x3x3o3x4x - captint, x3x3x3x4x - gacnet, x3x3x3o4x - cogart

External links 
 
 Polytopes of Various Dimensions, Jonathan Bowers
 Multi-dimensional Glossary

5-polytopes